Sophie Ormond (born 4 August 1979) is a British former alpine skier who competed in the 1998 Winter Olympics.

References

1979 births
Living people
British female alpine skiers
Olympic alpine skiers of Great Britain
Alpine skiers at the 1998 Winter Olympics
Place of birth missing (living people)